Grangea maderaspatana, commonly known as Madras carpet, is a flowering plant in the family Asteraceae.

Description
This plant displays as a branched herb with cylindrical, grayish roots, growing up to 70 cm tall. The achenes are compressed and narrowly winged.

Distribution 
This species grows commonly in moist places in warm temperate to tropical areas. It is widely distributed throughout India and Nepal.

References

Astereae